Kate Moloney is an Australian netballer who plays for the Melbourne Vixens in the Suncorp Super Netball league. As of April 2017, she is the captain of the Vixens. Moloney made her domestic league netball debut for the Vixens in 2013 and was appointed captain of the team four years later. She made her debut for the Australian national netball team in 2017, going on to be selected in the Australian Diamonds squad for the 2018/19 international season. Kate has represented her country on 25 occasions.

She also captained the 2017 Australian Fast5 team in Melbourne.

Moloney is currently studying a Master of Business (Sport Management) at Deakin University.

Netball Career Facts
 2013 Melbourne Vixens debut
 2014 Melbourne Vixens Premiership
 2014 Melbourne Vixens Coaches Award
 2015 Melbourne Vixens Coaches Award
 Melbourne Vixens Captain (2017–present)
 2017 Samsung Australian Diamonds debut
 2017 Australian Fast5 Captain
2019 Super Netball Team of the Year recipient 
 2020 Melbourne Vixens Premiership
 2020 Sharelle McMahon medalist
 2020 Super Netball Team of the Year recipient
 2021 Melbourne Vixens Coaches Award
 2021 Sharelle McMahon medalist
 2022 Commonwealth Games Gold medalist

References

1993 births
Living people
Australian netball players
Australia international netball players
Australia international Fast5 players
Netball players at the 2022 Commonwealth Games
Commonwealth Games gold medallists for Australia
Commonwealth Games medallists in netball
Netball players from Victoria (Australia)
Melbourne Vixens players
Victorian Fury players
Suncorp Super Netball players
Victorian Netball League players
Australian Netball League players
Medallists at the 2022 Commonwealth Games